Hanna Hall is a historic building located on the campus of Waynesburg University at Waynesburg in Greene County, Pennsylvania. It is located directly to the east of Miller Hall. It was built in 1851, and is a three-story, rectangular red brick building in the Federal-style.  It has a gable roof topped by a wooden bell tower.  

It was named for Reverend William Hanna in 1896.  The building has housed offices, classrooms, an elementary school, and dormitory.

It was listed on the National Register of Historic Places in 1979. It is included in the Waynesburg Historic District.

References 

Waynesburg University
School buildings on the National Register of Historic Places in Pennsylvania
Federal architecture in Pennsylvania
School buildings completed in 1851
Schools in Greene County, Pennsylvania
1851 establishments in Pennsylvania
National Register of Historic Places in Greene County, Pennsylvania
Historic district contributing properties in Pennsylvania